Vernice bianca is a type of sealer varnish used in violin making. It is mainly prepared with a mix of egg white and gum arabic.

The following is taken directly from American Lutherie #10 in 1987 when interviewing Jack Batts. It is also in The Big Red Book vol 1 from Guild of American Luthiers.

A recipe for “Vernice Bianca” from Simone Fernando Sacconi

25g of gum arabic
1/2 teaspoon of honey
1/4 teaspoon of rock candy [ambiguous term] 
about 100cc of water
albumen from one egg white.

- Crush the rock candy
- Warm the water but do not boil
- Slowly add the gum arabic, stirring constantly until dissolved
- Add honey and rock candy 
- Strain the mixture through a fine cloth (handkerchief or sheeting) and let cool

While the mixture is cooling

- whip an egg white into a meringue and turn the bowl on edge.
- Allow the mixture to settle out and remove the liquid that separates. (This is the albumin)
- Add the albumin to the cooled mixture and stir well.

Use this Vernice Bianca immediately and discard the rest.

Sacconi advocated that after potassium silicate had been put on very sparingly, you should cover it completely with the vernice bianca before varnishing.

This preparation is highly efficient in strengthening the inside and outside of violins, as well as improving the acoustic of the instruments. (Increased wave propagation speed and decreased dampening of vibration).

According to Simone Fernando Sacconi, this "white varnish" is of significant importance in violin making as it allows for thinner plates, lighter and better sounding instruments. One can apply two layers of this preparation inside as well as outside of the sound box. This white varnish is transparent and is absorbed by the wood. It is absorbed by the spruce top more than by the other maple parts; it has an uniforming effect on the whole soundbox.

This preparation is likely to be a key element for the "secret" of old Cremonese instruments as a classical violin with most of its varnish gone keeps its acoustical qualities, whereas an instrument re-varnished with a wrong varnish is suffocated and loses its acoustical qualities.

This varnish won't turn a bad instrument into a good one. The soundbox prior to the white varnish application must be fine tuned (plate tuning). The genius of Stradivarius was, according to Sacconi, that he was able to anticipate the modification and the potential improvement of the Vernice Bianca application and tune the unfinished instrument accordingly.

Violins